Örnök is a village in Issyk-Kul Region of Kyrgyzstan. It is part of the Issyk-Kul District. Its population was 1,397 in 2021.

References
 

Populated places in Issyk-Kul Region